Esteban Albarrán Mendoza (born 30 June 1968) is a Mexican politician from the Institutional Revolutionary Party. From 2009 to 2012 he served as Deputy of the LXI Legislature of the Mexican Congress representing Guerrero.

See also 
 2015, Guerrero state election

References 

1968 births
Living people
Politicians from Guerrero
Institutional Revolutionary Party politicians
21st-century Mexican politicians
National Autonomous University of Mexico alumni
Autonomous University of Guerrero alumni
Members of the Congress of Guerrero
Deputies of the LXI Legislature of Mexico
Members of the Chamber of Deputies (Mexico) for Guerrero